Baldovinești is a commune in Olt County, Oltenia, Romania. It is composed of three villages: Baldovinești, Gubandru and Pietriș. It included four other villages until 2004, when they were split off to form Găvănești Commune.

References

Communes in Olt County
Localities in Oltenia